The Thornton Wilder Prize for Translation, established in 2009, is awarded by the American Academy of Arts & Letters to a practitioner, scholar or patron who has made a significant contribution to the art of literary translation. It was established by Tappan Wilder and Catharine Wilder Guiles, the nephew and niece of Academy member Thornton Wilder (1897–1975), and given for the first time in 2009.

Recipients

References

American literary awards
Translation awards
Literary translation
English-language literary awards
Awards established in 2009